StarMetro is the city-owned and operated public bus service for Tallahassee, Florida, and was previously known as TalTran. StarMetro operates both fixed-route and dial-a-ride service in the Tallahassee metropolitan area.

History 
Fixed-Route Service began when the City of Tallahassee purchased the public transit system from Cities Transit Company and renamed it “Taltran” in 1973. The City of Tallahassee completed the construction of the administration and maintenance building at 555 Appleyard Drive in 1976. In 1984, the city began offering Dial-A-Ride service. Construction of C.K. Steele Plaza ended in 1986. TalTran changed its name to StarMetro in 2005 during a "Renaissance", which included new buses and improved stops. StarMetro received federal grants in both 2011 and 2017 to purchase battery-electric buses.

COVID-19 response 
In response to the COVID-19 pandemic, StarMetro implemented many changes:

 Capped bus capacity at 20 passengers to facilitate social distancing
 Required masks/face coverings to be worn while on the bus
 Suspended trolly service
 Weekday service ends at 8:00 pm
 Suspended FSU campus routes from March through August
 Installed driver barriers

Routes
StarMetro operates every day of the year except for Thanksgiving and Christmas Day. Weekday service consists of 15 regularly scheduled fixed-routes, two flex-routes, and one express route that operates during peak travel times. The "Saturday" schedule consists of 12 of the weekday routes, typically with the earliest trip eliminated and/or the headway reduced. The "Sunday" schedule consists of a completely separate system of four routes that is not as extensive as the weekday/Saturday routes. The Sunday route system is also run on weekday and Saturday nights (7:00p.m. to 10:00p.m.). All weekday and Saturday routes are named for Tallahassee area locations and symbols while the Sunday routes are numbered.

Additionally, Monday-Friday from 11:30 A. M. to 2:50 P. M. (last stop) & on Friday and Saturday evenings from 4:30 P. M. to 1:00 A. M. (last stop), StarMetro operates The "Lunch/Dinner Trolley" route, which offers free service to various entertainment locations in the Gaines Street (College Town), Downtown, Cascades Park and Midtown areas, serving each stop approximately every 20 minutes ("Lunch Trolley") & 30 minutes ("Dinner Trolley").

During "Celebrate America" on July 4th (Unofficially Route J4), StarMetro offers a special opportunity to view The Annual Fireworks at Tom Brown Park. So Park your car and enjoy a free bus ride to the event! Busses leave from The New Koger Center (Hartman Bldg.) on Capital Cir. SE starting at 6:00 P. M., and continue operating approximately every 15 minutes until the last shuttle @ 8:30 P. M.  After the Fireworks have concluded, or 10:00 P. M., return service will commence with the last shuttle leaving Tom Brown Park @ 11:00 P. M.

Weekday routes

Saturday routes
Also operates Martin Luther King, Jr. Day, Veterans' Day & Day after Thanksgiving

Sunday &  night routes 
Also operates New Year's Day, Memorial Day, 4 July & Labor Day

FLEX routes 
StarMetro also offers two "FLEX" route which connects residents in the Lake Jackson area to the Lake Jackson town center, where riders can transfer to the Big Bend and Forest routes. The other "FLEX" route serves residents in the Southside, where riders can transfer to the Dogwood, Gulf, Live Oak and Moss routes. Riders must call StarMetro two hours before they wish to be picked up in order to use the FLEX routes.

Dial-A-Ride 
Dial-A-Ride provides curb-to-curb transportation to citizens with a qualifying disability within 3/4 mile of StarMetro's fixed route system in compliance with the Americans with Disabilities Act. Riders can schedule their rides online or over the phone up to fourteen days in advance. The service costs $2.50 per ride.

Dial-A-Ride Hours of Operation:

 Weekdays, 5a.m. to 11p.m.
 Saturdays, 5:45a.m. to 7:45p.m.
 Sundays, 10:30a.m. to 7p.m.
 Certain holidays are excluded.

Campus routes

StarMetro operates seven fixed routes on the campus of Florida State University when class is in session. StarMetro has been providing campus transportation to FSU since 1973. The FSU Nite Nole route operates Monday through Saturday nights. These routes are free to the public and connect campus with nearby student housing facilities. In Fall 2019, FSU signed a 10-year contract with StarMetro to continue providing campus bus services. As part of the new contract, StarMetro began purchasing all electric buses to run exclusively on FSU campus routes. In 2017, each Proterra XR-Plus bus costs approximately $719,000 with a battery lease. The first campus route to go fully electric was the Heritage Route. Beginning in the Fall 2020 semester, campus bus routes and times have been altered in order to prepare for the full roll out of electric buses across all routes. FSU installed two overhead charging stations at the Doak Campbell Stadium bus stop and at Stadium Drive and Spirit Way. Currently, the university pays StarMetro a fee of $91.45/bus/hour to operate campus routes. All campus routes were temporarily discontinued in March 2020 when the university closed due to COVID-19. Campus routes reopened in August 2020, with limited capacity and service. Service resumed normal operations in Fall 2021.

StarMetro used to provide fixed routes on the Florida A&M University campus, but this was discontinued when the institution decided not to renew its contract with the agency and began providing campus shuttle services in-house.

Enhanced services
Bike-On-Bus is a free bike rack system which allows up to two people on a first-come, first-served basis, to load their bikes onto bike racks fixed to front of the buses
Next by Text allows riders to learn the arrival time of the next bus at any stop by texting the stop number to 27299.
Spirit Express transports Florida State Seminoles football fans from the Tallahassee–Leon County Civic Center to Doak Campbell Stadium and back. Children under 12 ride for free.
Bus charters are available with StarMetro.
Community Transportation Coordinator. Transportation services for citizens throughout Leon County are available. Riders must qualify through Medicaid, Developmental Disabilities or the Transportation Disadvantaged program for transportation. This is door-to-door service with fares charged based on the sponsoring program.
Digital Bus Pass allows riders to purchase and use bus passes using the Token Transit App.

Fares
The regular, one-trip fare is $1.25 and the reduced one-trip fare is $0.60. The reduced fare is available for seniors, children, disabled persons and people on Medicare. Passengers who purchase a one-trip fare may request a transfer ticket from the driver, which are free; those are valid for up to two transfers within 90 minutes of the ticket being issued; round-trips & stopovers are prohibited. Kids below 6 ride for free with fare-paying rider; limit 3. K-12 Students can ride fare-free with valid Student I.D. (will be in effect only during the Fall 2020 semester).

StarMetro offers three unlimited ride pass options: rolling 24 hours of unlimited rides for $3, rolling weekly unlimited for $10, and a rolling 31-day unlimited pass for $38.

StarMetro purchased a new fare collection system in 2020, which streamlines and enhances payment options for customers. The new farebox accepts multiple forms of payment including tickets or smart cards purchased at the customer service window at CK Steele Plaza or the StarMetro Administration office, tickets or smart cards purchased at the Ticket Vending Machine at CK Steele Plaza, Leon County School STAR cards, FSU or FAMU student IDs, special organization passes, mobile tickets purchased through Moovit or Token Transit, and cash.

Facilities and infrastructure

C.K. Steele Plaza 
StarMetro's main station is C.K. Steele Plaza ("the plaza"), which was named for the Reverend Charles Kenzie Steele. It is located at 111 West Tennessee Street in downtown Tallahassee on the block bordered by Tennessee Street, Adams Street, Call Street, and Duval Street. The plaza features 24 covered gates for passenger boarding and alighting. Amenities at the plaza include restrooms, covered seating areas, bus driver lounge, and a customer service booth. Fourteen out of the 15 regularly scheduled weekday routes (Azalea, Big Bend, Dogwood, Evergreen, Forest, Gulf, Hartsfield, Killearn, Moss, Park, Red Hills, San Luis, Tall Timbers and Southwood Express) stop at the plaza, in addition to The Heritage Route serving Florida State University Campus, making it the single busiest stop in the system. In addition to StarMetro busses, Steele Plaza serves as the eastern terminus of the Gadsden Express route, which connects the residents of Quincy and Midway to Tallahassee. The new Havana Express connects with Big Bend & Forest Routes at Lake Jackson. The new Jefferson Express connects the residents of Monticello to Tallahassee. All these routes are operated by Big Bend Transit, with funding provided by Florida Dept. of Transportation (FDOT).

Plans to renovate the plaza and turn it into a mixed-use facility to include bus bays, StarMetro office space, and even leasable office space have been proposed. However, funding has not yet been procured.

Headquarters 
The headquarters for StarMetro are located at 555 Appleyard Drive at the corner of Appleyard and Jackson Bluff Road. Only two routes pass this facility (Forest and Live Oak). Located on this property are administrative offices, a bus maintenance facility, bus parking lot, call center, and customer service window. StarMetro is planning to relocate their bus storage and maintenance facility to a larger plot of land to accommodate for their growing fleet.

Bus stops 
Bus stops are referred to as Star Stops, and they are denoted by a rectangular blue sign featuring a white star, route in appropriate color that serves particular location & days of operation. Stops served exclusively by FSU Campus Routes have a different sign with the Seminole Express logo and FSU colors. Many stops have no amenities, while the busier stops and transfer points have various amenities including benches, waste containers, and/or covered shelters.

Super-Stops 
StarMetro plans to construct a series of "Super Stops" that will serve as transfer points in places where three or more routes currently or potentially intersect. These stops will be on a smaller scale of C.K. Steele Plaza and will feature covered walkways, benches, restrooms, and vending machines. StarMetro has plans to build three Super Stops on South Adams Street, North Monroe Street, and Hartsfield Road (near Mission Road). Each Super Stop is estimated to cost $3 million to construct.

A temporary park, costing $300,000 is being constructed at the future South Side Super Stop on the corner of Orange and Meridian Roads. Funding for the Super Stop, which comes from a penny sales tax, will not be available until 2020.

Fleet

Active fixed route fleet
Currently, StarMetro operates a mix of Gillig and Proterra buses on their fixed routes. Their buses are powered by diesel, CNG, or battery electric.  In March 2020, StarMetro began fabricating barriers to separate drivers from passengers as a response to COVID-19.

Dial-A-Ride & FLEX route active fleet 
StarMetro operates a mixed fleet of vehicles for its FLEX and Dial-A-Ride routes.

Promotional fleet

Retired fleet

Improvements 
From 2006 to 2009, StarMetro began a makeover including new routes, stations, and stops. One planned change is the addition of two new transfer stops. These stops will make it possible to travel across Tallahassee without changing buses at the downtown hub station. In addition, StarMetro is planning wireless internet and television in buses, GPS-enabled buses with live location maps over the Internet, solar-lighted stops with live location maps, and blinking lights at stops to let drivers know of waiting passengers. The C.K. Steele station includes renovation and installation of information kiosks. Seats on the newer-model buses are made of padded plastic and are arranged front-facing in rows and sideways against the walls, much like a subway car layout. All models in use except the Dial-A-Ride shuttle vans exceed 4000 pounds, and therefore are not equipped with seat belts. All buses are equipped with climate-control and interior lighting.

StarMetro implemented a complete route overhaul dubbed "Nova2010" in 2011, which reduced the current system to 11 routes, of which only 4 were intended meet at CK Steele Plaza. The routes ran at closer intervals than before, while providing transfer points all over the city — no longer requiring all two-bus trips to transfer at CK Steele Plaza. The Nova2010 project was met with public backlash, with many patrons feeling dissatisfied with the level of public engagement. By 2013, the StarMetro system reverted to a hub-and-spoke system with all but one route (Live Oak) meeting at CK Steele Plaza to facilitate transfers. Since then, there have been minor adjustments made with a major change occurring in 2019. This resulted in the splitting of the San Luis route and the creation of the Hartsfield route. Public engagement was extensive and changes were a direct result from public input.

In 2021, StarMetro staff began pursuing the construction of the Southside Transfer Center, which will be located on the northwest corner of Orange Avenue and Meridian Road. The new transfer center will require another restructuring of the StarMetro Fixed Route System. StarMetro began its Think Transit Campaign in 2021 to solicit public feedback on the design and construction of the Southside Transfer Center and new fixed route system.

Future improvements 
StarMetro has plans to begin Bus-Rapid Transit along Tennessee Street and Mahan Drive (currently serviced by the Azalea route) and to Woodville and Crawfordville through a joint venture with the Capital Regional Transportation Planning Agency. Plans also call for streetcar lines near the FSU, FAMU, and TCC campuses. And commuter rail services to Jefferson and Gadsden counties.

References 

Transportation in Tallahassee, Florida
Bus transportation in Florida
Transportation in Leon County, Florida